Sorsogon language may refer to:

 Northern Sorsogon language, an Austronesian language spoken in the Philippines
 Southern Sorsogon language, an Austronesian language spoken in the Philippines